Vatten och bröd (Swedish for Water and Bread) is the debut studio album released by Swedish singer and songwriter Veronica Maggio. It was released in Sweden on 6 September 2006 through Universal Music AB and debuted at number 18 on the Swedish Albums Chart, while peaking at number 14. The album was recorded and produced by Maggio in the studio of Christian Walz in Östermalm, Stockholm.

Singles
 "Dumpa mig" was released on 20 March 2006 as the lead single from the album. It peaked at number 14 on the Swedish Singles Chart.
 "Nöjd?" was released on 5 July 2006 as the second single from the album. It peaked at number 6 on the Swedish Singles Chart.
 "Havanna Mamma" was released on 25 October 2006 as the third single from the album.

Track listing

Charts

Release history

References

2006 debut albums
Universal Music AB albums
Veronica Maggio albums